Jack Cochrane may refer to:
 Jack Cochrane (rugby league)
 Jack Cochrane (American football)